Trigger Man is a 2007 American thriller film written and directed by Ti West.

Premise
Three friends from Manhattan are stalked while hunting in rural Delaware.

Production
Filming took place in Wilmington, Delaware.

References

External links 
 

2007 films
2007 action thriller films
Films set in Delaware
Films shot in Delaware
Films directed by Ti West
2000s English-language films